Alicia Alexandra Martha Kearns (born 11 November 1987) is a British Conservative Party politician. She has been the Member of Parliament (MP) for Rutland and Melton since the 2019 general election. 

In October 2022, Kearns was elected Chair of the Foreign Affairs Select Committee.

Early life and career
Kearns grew up in Cambridgeshire, and attended a comprehensive school, Impington Village College. During her teenage years, she was a member of the UK Youth Parliament and an activist for Amnesty International. She studied social and political sciences at Fitzwilliam College, Cambridge, graduating in 2009. During university, she participated in student theatre productions.

Kearns has worked in communication roles at the Ministry of Defence (MOD), Ministry of Justice (MoJ), and the Foreign and Commonwealth Office (FCO). She was the lead press officer for MOD's contribution to the 2014 Scottish independence referendum campaign, and the government's communication campaigns in Syria and Iraq for the FCO. At the MoJ, she worked as the Victims' Minister's press secretary. Kearns became the client services director for the strategic communications consultancy Global Influence in 2016. She later became an independent consultant.

Parliamentary career
Kearns was selected as the Conservative candidate for Rutland and Melton on 8 November 2019. It is a notionally safe Conservative seat, having been represented by a member of the party since the constituency's creation in 1983. She had previously stood in the 2017 general election in the safe Labour seat Mitcham and Morden and was also in the final shortlist in the same election for the safe Conservative seat Chelmsford but lost the selection to then-MEP Vicky Ford. She was elected in the 2019 general election with a majority of 26,924 votes.

Kearns is a supporter of transgender rights and in August 2020 co-authored an article in ConservativeHome with fellow MP Nicola Richards which called on the government to reform the Gender Recognition Act 2004.

Some newspapers and broadcasters alleged that Kearns was part of an attempt by Conservative MPs elected in the 2019 general election to oust then Prime Minister Boris Johnson over Partygate in January 2022. She said that she met with concerned MPs, but denied leading a rebellion against Johnson, stating that "I make no apology for meeting with my colleagues, but it was not a coup or any such activity despite the mischief of the media or certain actors who might wish to suggest otherwise."

Kearns has been a member of the Foreign Affairs Select Committee since March 2020. She is also on the steering committee of the China Research Group. On 12 October 2022, she was elected as the first female Chair of the Foreign Affairs Select Committee, replacing Tom Tugendhat. She is also a member of the Liaison Committee as a chair of a select committee.

Personal life 
Kearns lives in the village of Langham in Rutland with her husband. The couple have a son and a daughter.

References

External links

1987 births
21st-century British women politicians
Alumni of Fitzwilliam College, Cambridge
Conservative Party (UK) MPs for English constituencies
Female members of the Parliament of the United Kingdom for English constituencies
Living people
People from Rutland
UK MPs 2019–present
21st-century English women
21st-century English people